The Transcantábrico is a metre-gauge tourist train service, crossing northern Spain along the Bay of Biscay. It is the oldest of Spain's tourist trains, managed by the Spanish public company FEVE since its inauguration in 1983 until 2012, when FEVE disappeared and Renfe Operadora took over.

History 
With the Transcantábrico, FEVE (Narrow Gauge Railways) created the first hotel-train in Spain. The original idea was to create a tourist train, emulating the legendary Orient Express, which would use FEVE's tracks in northern Spain. The special feature of this train is that, unlike other tourist trains, it operates on  gauge track.

It opened for business on 30 July 1983 with an inaugural trip between La Robla and Cistierna in Leon. Its original composition was three Pullman lounge cars built in the UK in 1923 (pub, bar and lounge), 4 bunk bed cars, a generator car and a service car for the crew.

 there are 2 trains, the Classic and the Luxury; the latter is considered the best tourist train in the world.

Itinerary 
For the first years it travelled between Leon and Ferrol (through Bilbao), until the closure of the Leon - Bilbao (Ferrocarril de La Robla) line, when it then travelled between Bilbao and Ferrol. After the reopening of the La Robla line in 2003, it returned to original route. In 2009 new special services were introduced from San Sebastián to Santiago de Compostela and from 2010 services were made regular to/from San Sebastian using this Basque Railway Network from Basauri.

Since 2011 there is also the Transcantábrico Luxury, a new tourist train that runs between San Sebastian and Santiago de Compostela, while the former tourist train was renamed Transcantábrico Classic, maintaining the traditional route between Leon and Ferrol (through Bilbao).

 there are 2 routes operating regular services from March until October:

 Luxury: running from San Sebastián to Santiago de Compostela and back.
 Classic: running from León to Santiago de Compostela through Bilbao and back.

The trains can also be hired for charter trips, adapted to clients, for groups and companies for incentives, conferences and exhibitions.

Facilities and services 

The current train composition is four saloon cars, seven sleeping cars, a generator wagon and a service car for the crew. The original bunk cabins have been replaced by suites equipped with bedroom and bathroom, a double bed, wardroom, bag storage, desk, safe, adjustable climate control, in-room music, telephone, minibar, and a bathroom with hairdryer and hydromassage shower/steam sauna.

The Luxury train composition is similar except that passenger capacity is halved, with rooms much larger than the Classic, with a living area apart from the bedroom, a two-metre double bed or twin beds, a sofa that converts into a double bed in the living room, flatscreen TV and a computer with free Internet connection.

Its lounges and suites combine early 20th-century charm with modern comforts such as Wi-Fi and flatscreen TV.

The original 1923 Pullman cars are authentic jewels of historical and railway heritage, and are used for serving onboard à la carte breakfasts and meals; the bar car is permanently open; other areas include tea lounges, the panoramic view car or the pub car, where parties, music or live shows are offered every night. All cars are interconnected, so travellers can move freely between them and their accommodation units.

Both in the train's lounges and in the renowned restaurants along the route, the gastronomic offer is handled by famous kitchens and chefs from northern Spain, celebrated for to the quality of its professionals and ingredients.

The crew is headed by an expedition leader and includes a guide, the head waiter, waiters, music entertainer, cleaners, security, train driver, bus driver and rail technicians. The guide accompanies travellers on all visits and restaurants. In addition it offers guests national, international and local press.

The maximum capacity is 54 people on the Classic train and 28 for the Luxury train.

References

Named passenger trains of Spain
Passenger rail transport in Spain
Railway services introduced in 1983
Heritage railways in Spain